Mahonia nitens is a shrub in the Berberidaceae described as a species in 1913. It is endemic to China, known from the provinces of Guizhou and Sichuan.

References

nitens
Endemic flora of China
Shrubs
Plants described in 1913